The 1748 English cricket season was the fifth season following the earliest known codification of the Laws of Cricket. Details have survived of six significant eleven-a-side and 18 single wicket matches. 1748 was the halcyon season of single wicket, perhaps never so popular before or since.

Matches 
Six matches between significant teams are known to have taken place.

10 June – Kent v England XI – Dartford Brent
13 June – England XI v Kent – Artillery Ground
14 June – Lambeth v London – Peckham Rye Common
18 July – London v Croydon – Artillery Ground
15 August – London v Deptford & Greenwich – Artillery Ground
23 August – Deptford & Greenwich v London – Upper Fountain, Deptford

Single wicket matches
A total of 18 significant single wicket matches are known to have taken place during 1748.

First mentions

Clubs and teams
 The Rest – earliest known use of this name by a team in a single wicket match on 6 June. The team was made up of Stephen Dingate, Little Bennett, Maynard, Collins and Thomas Waymark. The other team involved in the match was Addington.

Players
 John Colchin (Bromley)

References

Bibliography

Further reading
 
 
 
 
 
 
 

1748 in English cricket
English cricket seasons in the 18th century